Organizational Research Methods is a quarterly peer-reviewed academic journal published by SAGE Publications on behalf of the Research Methods Division of the Academy of Management. It covers research methods in organizational and management studies, including both qualitative and quantitative approaches. The editor-in-chief is Paul D. Bliese (University of South Carolina). The journal was established in 1998.

Abstracting and indexing
Organizational Research Methods is abstracted and indexed in Scopus and the Social Sciences Citation Index. According to the Journal Citation Reports, it has a 2017 impact factor of 4.918, ranking it 5th out of 82 journals in the category "Psychology, Applied" and 17th out of 209 journals in the category "Management".

References

External links
 

Publications established in 1998
Business and management journals
Quarterly journals
Research methods journals
SAGE Publishing academic journals
English-language journals